Dacalana sinhara is a species of butterfly belonging to the lycaenid family described by Hans Fruhstorfer in 1914. It is found in  the Indomalayan realm (Burma, Thailand, Peninsular Malaya).

References

External links
Dacalana at Markku Savela's Lepidoptera and Some Other Life Forms

Dacalana
Butterflies described in 1914